A state university, in the United States, is an institution in a state university system.

State university may also refer to:

 Public university, a university that is owned or significantly funded by a government
 State university (India), state-funded public universities in India
 State University (Louisville), now Simmons College of Kentucky, a historically Black college in Louisville, Kentucky, US
 State university (Philippines), public universities in the Philippines
 State university (Russia), public universities in Russia
 Several universities in Ukraine, see List of universities in Ukraine
 State University of Bangladesh
 Belarusian State University
 Baku State University
 State University (Tbilisi Metro), a railway station in Tbilisi, Georgia

See also
National Universities
 State College (disambiguation)